The HD Pentax DA 55-300mm lens, is a telezoom lens line for the Pentax K-mount. There are 4 generations so far. 

The first generation was the SMC Pentax-DA 55-300mm F4-5.8 ED, green side band. It was produced from 2008 to 2013. 

The second generation was the SMC Pentax-DA L 55-300mm F4-5.8 ED, silver side band "plastic fantastic".  It began in 2010 and is still in production.

The third generation of this lens line up is the HD Pentax DA 55-300mm F4.0-5.8 ED WR, red side band, released in 2013.  It added weather sealing.

The fourth generation HD Pentax-DA 55-300mm f/4.5-6.3 ED PLM WR RE, no side band, green front band, was released in 2016.  It added Pulse Moter (PLM) for quieter, faster and more accurate auto focus.  It is also shorter and about 10% lighter than the third generation, although its max apertures are smaller.  It requires the KAF4 lens mount, so Pentax DSLRs before 2013 are not able to use this lens.  Other compatible models still need a firmware update before they can use this lens.  Some models, such as the Pentax K-30, can potentially bypass this limitation by running a "hacked" Pentax K-50 firmware.

References
Ricoh Imaging Americas Corp., smc PENTAX DA 55-300mm F4-5.8 ED

External links

55-300